Lise Grande is an American who has served as the president of the United States Institute of Peace since December 1, 2020. She has previously served in several positions at the United Nations.

Education 
Grande earned a bachelor's degree from Stanford University and a master's degree from The New School.

Career
From 2008 to 2012, she worked with the United Nations in South Sudan and held was the deputy representative of the Secretary-General and Humanitarian Coordinator. From 2005 to 2008, she worked with the United Nations in the Republic of the Congo where she held the position of Head of the United Nations Integrated Office. From 2003 to 2005, she worked as the UNDP representative in Armenia.

Grande was previously a deputy special representative of the United Nations Assistance Mission for Iraq. Grande was also the resident coordinator with the United Nations Development Programme (UNDP) in India.

Grande is the UN Resident Coordinator in Yemen. As Resident Coordinator in Yemen, she is also the UN Humanitarian Coordinator (HC).

References

Living people
Year of birth missing (living people)

American officials of the United Nations
Stanford University alumni
The New School alumni